Choteau Creek is a stream in the U.S. state of South Dakota.

Choteau Creek has the name of the Chouteau family.

See also
List of rivers of South Dakota

References

Rivers of Bon Homme County, South Dakota
Rivers of Charles Mix County, South Dakota
Rivers of Douglas County, South Dakota
Rivers of South Dakota